Genevra may refer to:

Places
 Geneva, Genevra in the Romansh language
 Genevra, California

People
 Genevra Richardson (born 1948), British legal scholar
 Genevra Stone (born 1985), American rower

See also
"Sonnet – to Genevra", a sonnet by Lord Byron